Yuva ( Youth) is a 2004 Indian Hindi-language political action film directed by Mani Ratnam. The film was simultaneously shot in Tamil as Aaytha Ezhuthu, and it is loosely based on the life story of George Reddy, a scholar from Osmania University of Hyderabad.

The film tells the stories of three young men from completely different strata of society and how one fateful incident on Kolkata's Howrah Bridge changes their lives forever. The narrative of the story is partially in hyperlink format.

At the 50th Filmfare Awards, Yuva received 7 nominations, including Best Villain, and won a leading 6 awards, including Best Film (Critics), Best Supporting Actor (Bachchan) and Best Supporting Actress (Mukerji).

Yuva was also a breakthrough for Bachchan as he won the Stardust Award for Actor of the Year – Male for his performance.

Background
The film is set in Kolkata. Michael (Ajay Devgn), Arjun (Vivek Oberoi), Vishnu (Karthik Kumar) and Trilok (Abhinav Kashyap) are leaders of a student organisation who want to remove the corruption involved in politics. However, their lives take an unexpected turn when Lallan Singh (Abhishek Bachchan), a goon working for ruthless politician Prosenjit Bhattacharya (Om Puri), tries to eliminate them.

Plot
The film begins with Lallan Singh (Abhishek Bachchan) shooting Michael "Mike" Mukherjee (Ajay Devgn) on his bike, resulting in him falling off the Vidyasagar Setu into the water below which is witnessed by Arjun Balachandran (Vivek Oberoi). The flashback of the characters prior to the incident then unveils.

Lallan is a goon, originally from Bihar but settled in Kolkata, West Bengal because his brother Gopal Singh (Sonu Sood) has left him alone and he had no option of earning back home. He loves, marries and abuses his wife, Shashi Biswas (Rani Mukerji).  He gets into a contract under Gopal's recommendation to run errands and work as a hitman for Prosenjit Bhattacharya (Om Puri), a politician.

Michael is an influential student leader who wants politicians like Prosenjit to keep away from college elections. His closest associates are his best friends Vishnu (Karthik Kumar) and Trilok (Abhinav Kashyap). Among the two, Vishnu acts as a right-hand man to Michael. Michael, in his personal life, is in love with his neighbour Radhika (Esha Deol) who lives with her uncle and aunt. Prosenjit is worried when he hears news of students standing in the election. He uses every possible way to get them out of politics. First, he provides a scholarship to a prestigious foreign university to Michael. When Michael refuses the bribe, he orders his goon, Gopal, to take control. Gopal orders Lallan to beat up Trilok, which he does; but faces very strong retaliation from Michael and his fellow students.

Arjun Balachandran (Vivek Oberoi) is the carefree and spoiled son of an IAS officer. He wants to relocate to the U.S. for a better future. He falls in love with Meera (Kareena Kapoor), whom he just met. Arjun asks Meera for coffee and takes her to the beach and realizes that Meera loves him back. One day, Arjun proposes to Meera, prompting her to playfully avoid him by getting into a taxi. Arjun gets a lift from Michael, who is travelling in the same direction to catch up with Meera, who is going that way. Suddenly, Michael is hit by three bullets (shot by Lallan) and falls off the bridge. He is critically injured but is saved by Arjun and Meera.

Lallan finds out that Michael is recovering from his injuries and this is witnessed by Arjun, who follows him to apprehend him, only for Lallan to beat him up badly and leave him with a broken arm. After staying by his side until his recovery, Arjun changes his mind and joins hands with Michael to contest in elections. Lallan later kills Gopal when he finds out that he had been instructed by Prosenjit to take him out due to Lallan leaving an eyewitness (Arjun) behind the bridge incident. He confronts Prosenjit, who brainwashes him to work for him and orders him to kidnap Arjun, Vishnu and Trilok. However, they escape with the help of Lallan's ally Dablu (Vijay Raaz), who has a change of heart after realizing that their profession was interfering with their personal lives, causing Sashi to leave Lallan for her hometown. He convinces Lallan, however to no avail and is killed by him when he aids Arjun's escape.

While running, Arjun calls Michael for help, but Lallan easily catches and beats him up. Michael arrives at the nick of time to rescue Arjun at Vidyasagar Setu. A fight ensues between the three men where Lallan is overpowered by Michael, who spares him and leaves him for the police. Lallan is handed to the police. Michael, Arjun, Vishnu and Trilok win the four seats they had contested for and thus enter into politics.

Cast

 Abhishek Bachchan as Lallan Singh, a goon working as muscle for politician Prosenjit Bhattacharya
 Ajay Devgn as Michael "Mike" Mukherjee, an activist who wants to encourage students to enter politics
 Vivek Oberoi as Arjun Balachandran, a wealthy young man who dreams of going to America
 Rani Mukerji as Shashi Biswas Singh, Lallan's wife who gets abused every day by him
 Kareena Kapoor as Meera, a girl who is going to Kanpur and Arjun's love interest
 Esha Deol as Professor Radhika, Michael's neighbor and also his love interest
 Om Puri as Prosenjit Bhattacharya, a ruthless politician and Lallan's boss who wants to get the college students out of politics
 Anant Nag as IAS Avinash Balachandran, Arjun's father
 Vijay Raaz as Dablu, Lallan's friend who helps Arjun, Vishnu, and Trilok escape
 Sonu Sood as Gopal Singh, Lallan's brother, a goon who had left his brother alone and later gets killed by him
 Saurabh Shukla as Dr. Gopal, Radhika's uncle
 Karthik Kumar as Vishnu, Michael's close associate who acts as a right-hand man to him
 Abhinav Kashyap as Trilok, Michael's close associate who once gets beaten up by Lallan Singh
 Paras Arora as Arvind Balachandran, Arjun's younger brother
 Tanusree Chakraborty as Arjun's classmate
 Kharaj Mukherjee as Advocate Vishal Ghoshal
 Brijendra Kala as Sheshadri, a newspaper editor 
 Sujata Sehgal as Joe Mukherjee, Michael's sister
 Lekha Washington as the girl at the embassy
 Simran (uncredited)

Production 
Hrithik Roshan was initially supposed to play the role of Lallan Singh, but was replaced by Abhishek Bachchan.

The film was shot at different locations including Kolkata, Chennai, Bhopal, Theni, Pollachi and other areas of West Bengal.

Soundtrack

The soundtrack features six songs by A. R. Rahman, with lyrics by Mehboob. The rap and lyrics for the song "Dol Dol" were by Blaaze.

Reception

Critical reception
The film received mixed-to-positive reviews from critics, with Bachchan and Mukerji's performances receiving particular praise. It was reported that the movie had the narrative style of the 2000 Mexican film Amores Perros.

Box office
Yuva grossed  at Indian box office. Yuva did well in multiplexes. But it did not do well in single-screen theatres.
Compared to other parts of the country, it fared better in Mumbai. The Mumbai distributors recovered the cost of the film, but the sub-territory distributors in places like Surat and Baroda lost money. In places like Delhi, Uttar Pradesh, Punjab, and even South India, distributors lost around  50 lakh (Rs 5 million) to  1 crore ( 10 million). In states like Madhya Pradesh and Chhattisgarh, the viewers couldn't relate to the film, hence leading to dismal business. Overseas, too, the film did below-average business.

Accolades

Notes

References

External links
 
 

2004 films
2000s Hindi-language films
Indian multilingual films
Indian nonlinear narrative films
Films directed by Mani Ratnam
Indian political thriller films
Hyperlink films
Films set in Kolkata
Films set in West Bengal
Films scored by A. R. Rahman
2004 multilingual films
Films shot in Kolkata
Films shot in Chennai
Films shot in Madhya Pradesh
Films shot in Pollachi
Films shot in West Bengal